Joseph Badalucco Jr. is an American actor known for portraying Jimmy Altieri on The Sopranos, and Detective "Jelly" Grimaldi on Third Watch.

Career 
Badalucco began his career as a carpenter and prop master in the late-1970s, working on Woody Allen films including Annie Hall, Manhattan, Interiors, and Stardust Memories. He also worked as a property master on The Godfather Part III. After becoming an actor in the 1990s, he had minor roles in Godzilla and The Siege.

Filmography

Film

Television

References

External links
 
 

American male film actors
American male television actors
Male actors from New York City
Year of birth missing (living people)
Living people
People from Brooklyn
American people of Italian descent